Zardeh (also known as Razdeh and Zarde) is a village in Ban Zardeh Rural District, in the Central District of Dalahu County, Kermanshah Province, Iran. At the 2006 census, its population was 1,204, in 240 families.

The village is populated by Kurds and is one of the most important sites in the Yarsani religion as it contains the Holy Tomb of Dawoud.

References 

Populated places in Dalahu County
Yarsan holy places
Kurdish settlements in Kermanshah Province